Jeremiah Burnham Tainter (January 6, 1836 in Prairie du Chien, Wisconsin – February 5, 1920) was an inventor and engineer known for having designed the Tainter gate in 1886. He began his work in hydrology in 1862, with the modification of pre-existing mill pond dams in Menomonie.  Tainter was employed by Knapp, Stout & Co., the largest lumber manufacturer in the United States in the last quarter of the 19th century. 

His brother, Andrew Tainter, was a principal in Knapp, Stout.

Tainter's inventions include:
  Thomas Parker, Jeremiah B. Tainter, Andrew Tainter & James Downing, "Sluiceway-gate." Issued April 13, 1880.
  Jeremiah Burnham Tainter, "Fifth wheel for vehicles." Issued May 10, 1881.
  Jeremiah Burnham Tainter, "Automatic sluiceway gate." Issued May 10, 1881.
  Jeremiah Burnham Tainter, "Coffer-dam." Issued July 6, 1886.
  Jeremiah Burnham Tainter, "Sluiceway gate." Issued July 6, 1886.
  Jeremiah Burnham Tainter, "Canal-lock." Issued July 6, 1886.
  Jeremiah Burnham Tainter & Nathan B. Noble, "Snap-hook." Issued April 2, 1889.
  Jeremiah B. Tainter, "Dam." Issued December 23, 1913.

References

External links

1836 births
1920 deaths
American engineers
19th-century American inventors
20th-century American inventors
American hydrologists
People from Prairie du Chien, Wisconsin
Engineers from Wisconsin
People from Menomonie, Wisconsin